The Boy from Oklahoma is a 1954 American western film directed by Michael Curtiz and starring Will Rogers, Jr., Nancy Olson and Anthony Caruso. It was produced and distributed by the major studio Warner Bros.

Plot

Cast
Will Rogers, Jr. as Sheriff Tom Brewster
Nancy Olson as Katie Brannigan
Lon Chaney, Jr. as Crazy Charlie	
Anthony Caruso as Mayor Barney Turlock
Wallace Ford as Postmaster Wally Higgins
Clem Bevans as Pop Pruty, Justice of the Peace
Merv Griffin as Steve
Louis Jean Heydt as Paul Evans
Sheb Wooley as Pete Martin
Slim Pickens as Shorty
Tyler MacDuff as Billy the Kid
James Griffith as Joe Downey

Background
The film became the basis for the 1957 Warner Bros. television series Sugarfoot, in which Will Hutchins replaced Rogers as lead character Tom Brewster. The movie features Lon Chaney, Jr.  and includes one of future TV talk show host Merv Griffin's few theatrical film roles. In the movie version, Rogers as Brewster substitutes facility with a twirling rope, similar to Will Rogers, Sr.'s, for the usual unerring speed and accuracy with firearms typically found in cinematic cowboy heroes.

Three of the original cast members from the movie, Louis Jean Heydt, Sheb Wooley, and Slim Pickens, were transplanted directly into the subsequent TV show's pilot, "Brannigan's Boots", playing their roles from the movie; the first episode of Sugarfoot follows the film's script fairly faithfully. Dennis Hopper succeeded James Griffith as Billy the Kid in the television version, Merry Anders took over the part of Katie Brannigan from Nancy Olson, and Chubby Johnson replaced Wallace Ford as Wally Higgins for the small screen.

This was the last film made by Curtiz as a contract director at Warner Bros. He had worked exclusively at the studio since 1926.

Reception
Reviewing the DVD release in 2013, Gene Triplett of The Oklahoman called the film an "amiable oater" with a plot that "may sound like potential corn on the cob to some" but turns out to be "unexpectedly well-crafted entertainment".

References

External links 
 

1954 films
1950s English-language films
Films directed by Michael Curtiz
Films scored by Max Steiner
1954 Western (genre) films
American Western (genre) films
Warner Bros. films
1950s American films